Marija Gluvakov – Medenica (Serbian Cyrillic: Марија Глуваков – Меденица) (born 3 April 1973), is a Serbian pianist and piano teacher.

Education
Gluvakov was born in Senta, Serbia, formerly Yugoslavia. She received her early training in music schools in Novi Kneževac, Bihać and Zemun.  She graduated from the Faculty of Music in Belgrade in 1995, as the best student of the year. She completed there, with the highest marks, her postgraduate studies in both Piano Performance (1999) and Chamber Music (1997). Her primary teacher were Srebrenka Široki, Zorana Grbić, Miloš Ivanović  and Olivera Djurdjević. She also studied with Dušan Trbojević, Arbo Valdma, Rita Kinka and with Russian pianists Dorensky and Pisarev, professors at the Moscow Conservatory. In 1995 she was  invited to continue her studies at the Manhattan School of Music in New York City. The invitation was made by famous Professor Solomon Mikowsky, a jury member at the Frédéric Chopin International Competition in Rome, who was especially delighted by Gluvakov's performance of the Third Piano Sonata  of Sergei Prokofiev.

Awards 

As a soloist and chamber musician, Marija Gluvakov won top prizes at many state and federal competitions in former Yugoslavia, as well as at the international competitions in Rome and Stresa, Italy (both in 1995).

Performance career

Marija Gluvakov has been performing throughout Serbia and abroad. The highlights of her career include the premiere of the composition named Gambit, written by eminent Serbian composer Rajko Maksimović (1995), performances in the Great Hall of the Ilija M. Kolarac Endowment in Belgrade, in the Church of St. Sophia in Ohrid, at the international music festivals  BEMUS, NOMUS, Donne in musica and ClarinetFest (with clarinetist Andrija Blagojević, I.C.A. National Chairperson for Serbia), recitals in Belgrade and Smederevo organized by EPTA, participation in the project named Classical Guerrilla (a cycle of concerts held in 2002 in the Hall of the Belgrade Philharmonic Orchestra), collaboration with Serbian and foreign artists in several multimedial projects, etc.

In addition to frequent solo and  chamber music recitals, as a soloist with orchestras, Gluvakov has performed standard piano concertos  (Bach, Beethoven, Schumann, Liszt).

She has recorded for the radio and television.

Teaching career 

Marija Gluvakov gained her first teaching experience during her postgraduate studies at the Faculty of Music in Belgrade, as a teaching assistant of Professor Ivanović (1995–1998). She got her first professional teaching engagement at the same institution, where she taught Piano and Accompaniment and Sight Reading under the supervision of eminent piano pedagogues Miloš Ivanović, Aleksandra Pavlović, Tijana Humo and Jokut Mihailović (1998–2004).

Gluvakov has been teaching at the University of Priština Faculty of Arts since 2004. She served first as an accompanist and secondary piano teacher (2004–2008). She was appointed assistant professor of piano in 2008.

Affiliations 

Ms. Gluvakov has been a member of the  Association of Musical Artists of Serbia since 1996.

External links 
 Biography
 Faculty of Arts of Priština
 Association of Musical Artists of Serbia
 Assistant professors at the University of Priština
 Faculty of Music in Belgrade

References 

1973 births
Living people
People from Senta
Academic staff of the University of Pristina
Academic staff of the University of Arts in Belgrade
Serbian classical pianists
University of Arts in Belgrade alumni
21st-century classical pianists